Der Spiegel des großen Magus is an East German film directed by Dieter Scharfenberg. It was released in 1980.

Cast
 Eberhard Esche: Magus
 Juraj Ďurdiak: Elias
 Klaus Piontek: Pravos
 Hanna Bieluszko–Vajda: Hanna
 Günter Naumann: Harom
 Cox Habbema: Airin
 Gerry Wolff: Aram
 Petr Skarke: Simon

External links
 

1980 films
East German films
1980s German-language films
Films based on fairy tales
1980s German films